{{Infobox person
| name = Zeinab Badawi
| image = Zeinab Badawi 02.jpg
| caption = Zeinab Badawi at Nobel Week Dialogue in Stockholm, 2016
| birthname = 
| employer = BBC
| birth_date = 
| birth_place = Khartoum, Sudan
| death_date = 
| death_place =
| education = St Hilda's College, OxfordSOAS, University of London
| occupation = Journalist, presenter, newsreader
| spouse =
| children = 4 
| nationality = British and Sudanese - dual citizenship
| credits = World News Today with Zeinab Badawi  HARDtalk  GMT   BBC News at Five
}}

Zeinab Badawi (born October 1959) is a Sudanese-British television and radio journalist. She was the first presenter of the ITV Morning News (later known as ITV News at 5:30), and co-presented Channel 4 News with Jon Snow from 1989 to 1998), before joining BBC News. Badawi was the presenter of World News Today broadcast on both BBC Four and BBC World News, and Reporters, a weekly showcase of reports from the BBC.

Early life
Badawi was born in October 1959 in Khartoum, Sudan and has lived in Britain since the age of two. Her great-grandfather, Sheikh Babiker Badri, fought against Kitchener's British forces at the Battle of Omdurman in 1898 and pioneered women's education in Sudan. Badawi's father, Mohammed-Khair El Badawi, was a newspaper editor in Sudan committed to social reform who, when the family moved to the UK, joined the BBC's Arabic Service. Badawi is bilingual and speaks both Arabic and English fluently.

Badawi was educated at Hornsey High School for Girls in North London, before studying Philosophy, Politics, and Economics (PPE) at St Hilda's College, Oxford. At Oxford, Badawi was a member of the Oxford University Broadcasting Society. In 1988 she moved back to London to pursue a full-time one-year MA degree at the School of Oriental and African Studies (SOAS), University of London, in Politics and Anthropology of the Middle East, graduating with distinction in 1989.

Journalism and awards

After graduating from Oxford University, Badawi was a researcher and broadcast journalist for Yorkshire TV from 1982 to 1986. After a period at BBC Manchester she joined Channel 4 News in 1988. Badawi co-presented Channel 4 News from 1989 until 1998 when she joined the BBC.

At the BBC Badawi worked as presenter and reporter for Westminster live political programmes for five years. She also worked on BBC radio as a regular presenter of The World Tonight on Radio 4 and BBC World Service's Newshour.

In 2005, Badawi became the new presenter of The World on BBC Four, the UK's first daily news bulletin devoted principally to international news. In May 2007 the programme was rebranded as World News Today and is also shown on the BBC World News channel.

She is a regular presenter of the BBC interview programme HARDtalk. In an exclusive interview in May 2009, Badawi interviewed Sudan's President Omar Al-Bashir, the first serving head of state to be charged with war crimes.

In November 2009, Badawi was named International TV Personality of the Year in the Annual Media Awards, the international media excellence awards organised by the Association for International Broadcasting.

Since 2010, in addition to her presenting role on BBC World News, Badawi has presented on the BBC News Channel and the BBC News at Five.

Badawi was awarded an honorary doctorate by the School of Oriental and African Studies (SOAS) in July 2011.

In May 2014 she was based in Johannesburg, presenting coverage of the South African elections on BBC World News and BBC News Channel.

For many years, Badawi has led an annual Nobel laureate discussion in connection with the Nobel festivities in Stockholm, Sweden. The programme is shown on Swedish television.

In 2017, Badawi hosted a nine-part series, The History of Africa'', based on UNESCO's General History of Africa. The documentary series was broadcast in July and August 2017 on BBC World News.

In August 2018, she was awarded the President's Medal of the British Academy "for her contributions to international political journalism".

Personal life
Badawi is a mother of two sons and two daughters. She lives in Belsize Park, north London.

Public positions

Badawi has been an adviser to the Foreign Policy Centre and a Council Member of the Overseas Development Institute.

She was Chair of the Royal African Society (RAS) from 2014 to 2021.

She is a trustee of the National Portrait Gallery (since 2004) and the British Council.

In June 2011 her appointment to the advisory board of the New College of the Humanities was announced.

Badawi is founder and chair of the Africa Medical Partnership Fund (AfriMed), a charity which aims to help local medical professionals in Africa.

Badawi is on the Board of Trustees at the Royal Opera House.

In October 2021 Badawi was appointed as the new President of SOAS University of London.

References

External links
 

1959 births
Living people
Alumni of St Hilda's College, Oxford
Alumni of SOAS University of London
BBC newsreaders and journalists
BBC World News
BBC World Service presenters
British reporters and correspondents
British television newsreaders and news presenters
British women television presenters
Sudanese television presenters
English people of Sudanese descent
English television journalists
English women journalists
ITN newsreaders and journalists
New College of the Humanities
Sudanese emigrants to the United Kingdom
Sudanese journalists
Sudanese women journalists
British women television journalists
Recipients of the President's Medal (British Academy)
Sudanese radio presenters
Sudanese women radio presenters
Sudanese women television presenters